Yuriy Kochkine is a Russian mixed martial artist. He competed in the Heavyweight division.

Mixed martial arts record

|-
| Win
| align=center| 7-4-1
| Milco Voorn
| Submission (kimura)
| Rings Russia: CIS vs. The World
| 
| align=center| 1
| align=center| N/A
| Yekaterinburg, Sverdlovsk Oblast, Russia
| 
|-
| Loss
| align=center| 6-4-1
| Mindaugas Kulikauskas
| TKO (strikes)
| Rings Lithuania: Bushido Rings 5: Shock
| 
| align=center| 1
| align=center| 2:46
| Vilnius, Lithuania
| 
|-
| Loss
| align=center| 6-3-1
| Heath Herring
| TKO (knees)
| Pride 22: Beasts From The East 2
| 
| align=center| 1
| align=center| 7:31
| Nagoya, Japan
| 
|-
| Win
| align=center| 6-2-1
| Yuri Zhernikov
| Submission (armbar)
| Universal Group: Remix 2001
| 
| align=center| 1
| align=center| N/A
| Vladivostok, Primorsky Krai, Russia
| 
|-
| Win
| align=center| 5-2-1
| Sergey Kaznovsky
| KO (strikes)
| Universal Group: Remix 2001
| 
| align=center| 1
| align=center| N/A
| Vladivostok, Primorsky Krai, Russia
| 
|-
| Loss
| align=center| 4-2-1
| Joop Kasteel
| Decision (unanimous)
| Rings Holland: Heroes Live Forever
| 
| align=center| 2
| align=center| 5:00
| Utrecht, Netherlands
| 
|-
| Win
| align=center| 4-1-1
| Roman Kostennikov
| Decision
| Rings Russia: Russia vs. Bulgaria
| 
| align=center| 2
| align=center| 5:00
| Tula, Russia
| 
|-
| Win
| align=center| 3-1-1
| Alistair Overeem
| Decision (split)
| Rings Russia: Russia vs. The World
| 
| align=center| 2
| align=center| 5:00
| Yekaterinburg, Sverdlovsk Oblast, Russia
| 
|-
| Loss
| align=center| 2-1-1
| Antônio Rodrigo Nogueira
| Technical Submission (armbar)
| Rings: King of Kings 1999 Block A
| 
| align=center| 1
| align=center| 0:40
| Tokyo, Japan
| 
|-
| Win
| align=center| 2-0-1
| Alistair Overeem
| Decision (majority)
| Rings: King of Kings 1999 Block A
| 
| align=center| 2
| align=center| 5:00
| Tokyo, Japan
| 
|-
| Win
| align=center| 1-0-1
| Malcolm Nay
| Submission (achilles lock)
| Rings: Extension Fighting 7
| 
| align=center| 1
| align=center| 4:33
| Japan
| 
|-
| Draw
| align=center| 0-0-1
| Ricardo Morais
| Draw
| Rings: Extension Fighting 4
| 
| align=center| 1
| align=center| 20:00
| Tokyo, Japan
|

See also
List of male mixed martial artists

References

Russian male mixed martial artists
Heavyweight mixed martial artists
Mixed martial artists utilizing sambo
Mixed martial artists utilizing Kyokushin kaikan
Mixed martial artists utilizing judo
Russian sambo practitioners
Russian male karateka
Russian male judoka
Living people
Year of birth missing (living people)